Sadilapur is a village in Kamrup rural district, situated near south bank of river Brahmaputra.

Transport
The village is near National Highway 37 and connected to nearby town -  Mirza, Kamrup and city - Guwahati with regular mini trekkers and other modes of transportation. The bus facility stopped in the year 2008. Mirza has a Railway station, and nearest airport is Guwahati international
airport.

See also
 Tokradia	
 Tarani

References

Villages in Kamrup district